Maintain is a song by Palestinian-Canadian rapper Belly, featuring vocals from fellow Canadian rapper and labelmate Nav. It was released on 6 April 2018 for streaming and digital download by Roc Nation and XO. The song was written by the two artists, and its producers, Austin Powerz and Trakgirl.

Background
"Maintain" is the lead single off the Immigrant album. It features guest vocals from Canadian rapper, and fellow XO labelmate, Nav. This would be their third collaboration, following "Re Up" (Belly, 2016), and "You Know" (Nav and Metro Boomin, 2017). The official music video for the song was released on 11 May 2018.

Music video
The music video was directed by Shomi Patwary. As of June 2019, the music video has clocked in over 3 million views on YouTube.

Charts

Release history

References

External links
 

2018 singles
2018 songs
Belly (rapper) songs
Nav (rapper) songs
Songs written by Belly (rapper)
Songs written by Nav (rapper)
Roc Nation singles
XO (record label) singles